Paraliomera is a genus of crabs in the family Xanthidae, containing the following species:

 Paraliomera dispar (Stimpson, 1871)
 Paraliomera longimana (A. Milne Edwards, 1865)
 Paraliomera macandreae (Miers, 1881)

References

Xanthoidea